Life In Death is an album released by The Oval Portrait through Eyeball Records on November 25, 2003. It was recorded at Stained Glass Studios in Paramus, New Jersey, by Jay Dezuzio and Alex Saavedra.  The album was named in allusion to the original title of the Edgar Allan Poe story from which the band took their name.  "Life In Death" features guest performances by Gerard Way of My Chemical Romance on the songs "Can't You Do Anything For Me?", "Barnabus Collins Has More Skeletons In His Closet Than Vincent Price" and "From My Cold Dead Hands", as well as Murder By Death's Sarah Balliet and Vincent Edwards on cello and piano for the songs "From My Cold Dead Hands" and "Santa Sangre".

Track listing

References

External links
 Myspace.com: The Oval Portrait
  Eyeball Records

2003 albums